Castilleja de la Cuesta is a town and municipality in the province of Seville, in the autonomous community of Andalusia, Spain.

Hernán Cortés died in this town on December 2, 1547.  He is not buried here, as his will directed that his remains be returned to Mexico.  They are interred in the Templo de Jesús, which is part of the Hospital de Jesús Nazareno in Mexico City.

This is the birthplace of actor and dancer Eduardo Cansino Sr., the father of Rita Hayworth. Footballer Miguel Ángel Llera, of Scunthorpe United, was also born here.

Castilleja de la Cuesta has a local specialty, the "torta de aceite". This is a thin, crisp baked good made with olive oil and having a hint of anise. They are eaten throughout Spain and exported to many countries.

References

Municipalities of the Province of Seville